The 2009 FIG Artistic Gymnastics World Cup series was a series of stages where events in men's and women's artistic gymnastics were contested. For the first time since the creation of the World Cup, no World Cup Final event was held; this makes 2009 the first year when the World Cup was competed as a yearly series of stages.

World Cup stages

Medalists

Men

Women

See also
 2009 FIG Rhythmic Gymnastics World Cup series

References

Artistic Gymnastics World Cup
2009 in gymnastics